Dave Myers and The Surftones were a Southern California surf group who are most likely remembered for the few singles they recorded in the 1960s which include their cover of The Revels hit "Church Key" and their time at the Rendezvous Ballroom in Balboa, California.

Group background
The Surftones were from Laguna Beach. The majority of the group had majored in music at college. Myers himself was a multi-instrumentalist. As well as playing guitar, he played steel guitar, tenor sax, trumpet and bongos. Their lineup in 1962 consisted of Dave Myers on lead guitar, Jon Curtis on rhythm guitar, Johnny Miller on bass guitar, Bob Hurtly on saxophone, and Bob Morosco on drums.

In 1962, Dave Myers and his group as well as another group called the Rhythm Rockers were regulars at the Rendezvous Ballroom in Balboa, California. They became the house band at the venue, having taken over from Dick Dale and his band.

Myers's father owned a store that was visited by Bob Hafner who was the partner of Tony Hilder. One day Hafner and Myers Sr. were having a conversation that got on to the subject of music. A short time later Hilder turned up. He came to one of their practice sessions and heard their version of "Church Key", a song he held the rights to. They would end up having two singles released on Hilder's Impact label. They were "Moment Of Truth" bw "Frogwalk" . They also covered The Revels hit "Church Key" bw "Passion" as Dave Myers and his Surf-Tones.

In late 1963, drummer Bob Callwell left the group. He was replaced by Ross van Kleist. Also in late 1963, the group played at the Second Annual Surf Fair, held at the Santa Monica Auditorium. This live event was recorded live and released on the Impact label as Shake! Shout! & Soul.

In 1964 Dave Myers and his group recorded a vocal single. After that he was playing instrumental music. In the mid-1960s, he recorded as the Dave Myers Effect, releasing an album called Greatest Racing Themes. It was later released on the Carole label in 1968.<ref>Billboard July 6, 1968 Page 13 GNP Crescendo Records Action Albums</ref> This album was produced by Larry Brown a/k/a Lawrence Brown who provided the music for the 1968 biker film, The Angry Breed''.

Venues
Other venues the group has played at include the San Clemente Ballroom. They also played at the Harmony Park Ballroom in Anaheim, California at the request of Dick Dale. Dale, who had an almost unblemished attendance record, was unable to perform so he asked Myers and his group to fill in for him on that occasion.

Later years
Their cover of "Church Key" is on the ultimate surf music playlist by SurferToday.com. In the 1980s, a Southern Californian surf music band called Kerry & The Surftones had based their name on, or had on Dave Myers and The Surftones as inspiration for their name.

Lineup

1962
 Dave Myers ......... lead guitar
 Bob Hurtly ........... sax
 Bob Morosco ...... drums
 Jon Curtis ........... rhythm guitar
 Johnny Miller ...... bass

Later
 Dave Myers ......... lead guitar
 Bob Colwell ......... drums
 Ross van Kliest ... drums (replaced Bob Callwell)
 Dennis Merrit ....... sax
 Bob Quarry .......... piano
 Johnny Curtis ...... rhythm guitar
 Seaton Blanco ..... bass

Discography

References

External links
 Surf Guitar 101  - Surftone Memories / Dave Myers And The Surftones By Dennis Merritt
 Surf Guitar 101 - Dave Myers and the Surftones Pictures Never Seen Before

Surf music groups
Rock music groups from California
Impact Records (California) artists
Del-Fi Records artists